Dizzy Down the Rapids is an arcade style action video game, that was published in 1991 by Codemasters for the Amstrad CPC, Spectrum and Commodore 64

The game involves Dizzy riding barrels down a river avoiding obstacles and enemies.  The game was based on the game play from an arcade game titled Toobin'. The C64 version was originally developed by Paul Black. The C64 version was originally a clone of Toobin called 'Toobin Turtles'. When the game was taken to Codemasters for consideration, it was rebranded to take advantage of the Dizzy character.

References

External links
 Dizzy Down the Rapids

1991 video games
Dizzy (series)
Codemasters games
Amstrad CPC games
ZX Spectrum games
Commodore 64 games
Amiga games
Atari ST games
DOS games
Video game clones
Video games scored by Allister Brimble
Video games developed in the United Kingdom